ITMA may refer to:

 Irish Traditional Music Archive, a national reference archive and resource centre for the traditional song, instrumental music and dance of Ireland, located in Dublin
 It's That Man Again, a BBC radio comedy programme which ran from 1939 to 1949.
 It's That Man Again (film), a 1943 film version of the radio show
 Chartered Institute of Trade Mark Attorneys, a UK professional body of trade mark attorneys
 ITMA exhibition, a worldwide series of international textile and garment technology exhibition, held every four years since 1951.
 "ITMA", a song by Half Man Half Biscuit on the 1997 album Voyage to the Bottom of the Road